Emma is a feminine given name. It is derived from the Germanic word ermen meaning "whole" or "universal". Its earliest use begins at least from the early seventh century, with Frankish royal daughter Emma of Austrasia and the wife of Eadbald of Kent found in written sources. Emma is also used as a diminutive of Emmeline, Amelia or any other name beginning with "em".

It has been among the top names given to baby girls all throughout North America, Europe, and Oceania in the past 10 years. It began gaining popularity in the United Kingdom during the 1960s. By 1974 it was the fourth most popular name for girls in England and Wales. It was still in the top 10 as late as 1995, but had fallen out of the top 20 by 2005 and in 2009 it ranked at 41st.

It became popular in the United States later in the 20th century, reaching the top 100 names for girls in the late 1990s. It has been among the top five names given to girls since 2002, and was the most popular name for girls in 2008, 2014, and 2015. It was among the five most popular names for both White and for Hispanic newborn girls in the American state of Virginia in 2022.

Notable people 

 Emma, Lady Hamilton (1765–1815), English artist's model and performer 
 Emma, Lady Radford (died 1937), English antiquarian and public servant
 Emma of Anjou (c. 1140 – c. 1214), Welsh royalty and half-sister of King Henry II of England
 Emma of Austrasia (fl. early seventy century), Frankish royalty
 Emma of Blois (c. 950–1003), Duchess consort of Aquitaine
 Emma of France (died 935), Queen of Western Francia and military leader
 Emma of Hawaii (1836–1885), queen to King Kamehameha IV from 1856 to his death in 1863
 Emma of Italy (fl. 948-987), Queen of Western Francia
 Emma of Lesum (c. 975–1038), saint and first female inhabitant of Bremen to be known by name
 Emma of Mělník (b. before 950, d. 1005/1006), wife of Boleslav II of Bohemia and Bohemian duchess
 Queen Emma of the Netherlands (1858–1934), Queen of the Netherlands and Grand Duchess of Luxembourg
 Emma of Normandy (c. 985–1052), twice Queen consort of the Kingdom of England
 Emma of Paris (943–968)
 Emma Adbåge (born 1982), Swedish illustrator and children's writer
 Emma Adler (1858–1935), Austrian journalist and writer
 Emma Ahuena Taylor (1867–1937), part-Native Hawaiian high chiefess
 Emma Albani (1847–1930), Canadian operatic soprano
 Emma Anderson (born 1967), English musician
 Emma Anderson (professor), Canadian professor
 Emma Andersson (born 1979), Swedish television personality and singer
 Emma Andijewska (born 1931), modern Ukrainian poet, writer and painter
 Emma Ania (born 1980), former track and field sprint athlete
 Emma Ankudey (born 1943), Ghanaian former amateur boxer
 Emma Anzai, bassist of Australian band Sick Puppies
 Emma B. Alrich (1845–1925), American journalist, author, educator
 Emma Appleton (born 1991), English actress and model
 Emma Asp (born 1987), Swedish footballer defender
 Emma Asson (1889–1965), Estonian politician
 Emma Atkins (born 1975), English actress
 Emma Whitcomb Babcock (1849–1926), American litterateur, author
 Emma Baeri (born 1942), Sicilian feminist historian and essayist
Emma Bailey (1910–1999), American auctioneer and author
 Emma Baker, television journalist and presenter employed by ITV Channel
 Emma Bale (born 1999), Belgian singer
 Emma Bardac (1862–1934), French singer
 Emma Barnett (born 1985), British broadcaster and journalist
 Emma Baron (1904–1986), Italian stage and film actress
 Emma Barrandeguy (1914–2006), Argentine writer, journalist, poet, storyteller and playwright
 Emma Barrie (born 2002), Scottish netball player
 Emma Barton (born 1977), English actress
 Emma Bartoniek (1894–1957), Hungarian historian and bibliographer
 Emma Bates (born 1992), runner
 Emma Pow Bauder (1848-1932), American evangelist and author
 Emma Beckett (footballer) (born 1987), Irish football midfielder
 Emma Bell (born 1986), American actress
 Emma Lee Benedict (1857-1937), American editor, educator, author
 Emma Bengtsson, Swedish chef
 Emma Bonino (born 1948), Italian politician and human rights activist
 Emma Scarr Booth (1835–1927), British-born American novelist, poet
 Emma Eliza Bower (1852–1937), American physician, club-woman, and newspaper owner, publisher, editor
 Emma Southwick Brinton (1834–1922), American Civil War nurse, traveller, correspondent
 Emma Elizabeth Brown (1847–?), American writer, artist
 Emma Alice Browne (1835-1890), American poet
 Emma Bull (born 1954), American science fiction and fantasy author
 Emma Bunton (born 1976), English singer, the Spice Girls
 Emma Caulfield (born 1973), American actress
 Emma Chamberlain (born 2001), American internet personality 
 Emma Churchill (1862–1957), founder of The Salvation Army in Newfoundland 
 Emma Shaw Colcleugh (1846–1940), American journalist, lecturer, traveler, collector 
 Emma Constable (born 1975), English badminton player
 Emma Corrin (born 1995), English actress
 Emma Amelia Cranmer (1858–1937), American reformer, suffragist, writer
 Emma D'Arcy (born 1992), English actor
 Emma Darwin (1808–1896), wife of Charles Darwin
 Emma Beard Delaney (1871–1922), Baptist missionary and teacher
 Emma Didlake (1905–2015), oldest U.S. veteran
 Emma Dumont (born 1994), American actress and model
 Emma Bedelia Dunham (1826–1910), American poet, teacher
 Emma Ellingsen (born 2001), Norwegian model
 Emma Catherine Embury (1806–1863), American author, poet
 Emma Engdahl-Jägerskiöld (1852–1930), Finnish opera singer
 Emma Pike Ewing (1838–1917), American educator, author
 Emma Ferguson (born 1975), English actress, Mile High
 Emma Sheridan Fry (1864–1936), American actress, playwright, teacher 
 Emma Fürstenhoff (1802–1871), Swedish florist
 Emma Sophia Galton (1811–1904), British finance guide author
 Emma Gatewood (1887–1973), American hiker
 Emma George (born 1974), Australian pole vaulter
 Emma Gilchrist, Canadian journalist
 Emma Goldman (1869–1940), Lithuania-born anarchist, writer and orator
 X González (born 1999), born Emma, American activist and advocate for gun control
 Emma Grant (footballer) (born 1989), Australian footballer
 Emma Green (athlete) (born 1984), Swedish athlete
 Emma Green (nurse) (1843–1929), 19th century southern belle
 Emma Jane Greenland (1760–1843), English painter, writer, singer
 Emma Azalia Hackley (1867–1922), African-American singer and political activist
 Emma Heming (born 1978), English actress
 Emma Churchman Hewitt (1850–1921), American writer, journalist 
 Emma Hippolyte, Saint Lucian politician
 Emma Hope (born 1962), British shoe designer
 Emma Hult (born 1988), Swedish politician
 Emma Hwang (born 1971), Taiwanese-American scientist and aquanaut
 Emma Jung (1882–1955), Swiss psychologist and writer
 Emma Lahana (born 1984), New Zealand actress and singer
 Emma Lai (born 1988), Hong Kong cricketer
 Emma Laine (born 1986), Finnish tennis player
 Emma Laird, British actress
 Emma Laura (born 1971), Mexican actress
 Emma Lazarus (1849–1887), American poet
 Emma Mackey (born 1996), French-British actress
 Emma Malabuyo (born 2002), American gymnast
 Emma Malewski (born 2004), German gymnast
 Emma B. Mandl (1842–1928), Bohemian-born American social reformer, clubwoman, and community leader
 Emma Marrone (born 1984), Italian pop singer
 Emma Mason (born 1986), Scottish badminton player
 Emma Masterson (born 1977), Thai actress, model, and television presenter
 Emma Meesseman (born 1993), Belgian basketball player
 Emma Miyazawa (born 1988), Japanese actress
 Emma Barrett Molloy (1839–1907), American journalist, lecturer, and activist
 Emma Huntington Nason (1845–1921), American poet, author, and musical composer
 Emma Neale (born 1969), New Zealand novelist and poet
 Emma Aline Osgood (1849–1911), American soprano
 Emma Raducanu (born 2002), British tennis player
 Emma May Alexander Reinertsen (1853–1920), American writer, social reformer
 Emma Reyes (1919–2003), Colombian painter and writer
 Emma Ann Reynolds (1862–1917), African-American teacher
 Emma Richter (1888–1956), German paleontologist
 Emma Rigby (born 1989), English actress
 Emma Roberts, British aristocrat
 Emma Roberts (born 1991), American actress and singer
 Emma Rochlin (born 1978), Scottish field hockey player
 Emma Winner Rogers (1855-1922), American writer, speaker, suffragist
 Emma Samms (born 1960), English actress
 Emma Sandys (1842–1877), English painter
 Emma Shapplin (born 1974), French soprano 
 Emma Augusta Sharkey (1858–1902), American writer, journalist, dime novelist, story-teller
 Emma L. Shaw (1840–1924), American magazine editor
 Emma Sinclair, British businesswoman
 Emma Slater (born 1988), British ballroom dancer
 Emma Snowsill (born 1981), Australian triathlete
 Emma Stone (born Emily Jean Stone in 1988), American actress
 Emma Sulkowicz (born 1992), American performance artist and activist
 Emma Swift (born 1981), Australian singer-songwriter
 Emma Taylor-Isherwood (born 1987), Canadian actress, Angel in Kuu Kuu Harajuku
 Emma Tennant (1937–2017), British novelist
 Emma Thompson (born 1959), British actress, comedian and screenwriter
 Emma Thynn, Viscountess Weymouth (born 1986), English socialite
 Emma Rood Tuttle (1839-1916), American writer, poet
 Emma Wallrup (born 1971), Swedish politician
 Emma Watkins (born 1989), Australian children's entertainer, The Wiggles
 Emma Watson (born 1990), British actress
 Emma Willard (1787–1870), women's education rights activist
 Emma Willis (born 1976), British TV presenter and former model, presenter of Big Brother
 Emma Willis (gymnast) (born 1992), Canadian artistic gymnast
 Emma Woikin (1920–1974), Canadian spy for the Soviet Union
 Emma Zimmer (1888–1948), overseer at the Ravensbrück concentration camp executed for war crimes

Characters 

 Emma in "Henry and Emma", a 1709 poem by Matthew Prior, which has been credited for first popularising the name.
 Emma, a main character in Billie and Emma
 Emma, the main character in Emma: A Victorian Romance
 Emma (The Promised Neverland), a main character in The Promised Neverland
 Emma, one of the main characters in the Teletoon Canadian animated sitcom Stoked
 Emma, the Amazon daughter of Dean Winchester from the television series Supernatural
 Emma, a supporting character in Darren Shan's novel series Zom-B
 Emma, a character in canadian animation series Total Drama
 Emma Bloom, peculiar girl in Ransom Rigg's series Miss Peregrine's Home for Peculiar Children
 Emma Brightness, a character in the anime series The Hidden Dungeon Only I Can Enter
 Emma Brooker, a character from the British soap opera Coronation Street
 Emma Bovary, the heroine of Gustave Flaubert's novel Madame Bovary
 Emma Carstairs, a character and protagonist in Cassandra Clare's The Shadowhunter Chronicles and heroine in The Dark Artifices
 Emma Coolidge in Heroes
 Emma Frost in Marvel Comics
 Emma Geller-Green, daughter of Rachel Green and Ross Geller on Friends
 Emma Gilbert in H2O: Just Add Water
 Emma Goodall, the pink ranger in Power Rangers Megaforce
 Emma Keane (Ackley Bridge), a teacher on Ackley Bridge
 Emma Kendo, a character in Resident Evil.
 Emma Kliesen, a minor character in the Tekken series
 Emma Karn, a main character in the NBC series Aquarius
 Emma Nelson, the staple character in Degrassi: The Next Generation
 Emma Peel, fictional television spy played by Diana Rigg in the British 1960s adventure series The Avengers
 Emma Pillsbury in Glee
 Emma Reid in Doctors
 Emma Ross on the Disney Channel series Jessie, and Bunk'd
 Emma Sheen, Gundam pilot from the AEUG group in the anime series Mobile Suit Zeta Gundam
 Emma Swan, protagonist of the television series Once Upon a Time
 Emma Verde, a character in the media project Nijigasaki High School Idol Club
 Emma Washburne, daughter of Zoe and Wash in the science fiction franchise Firefly
 Emma Wheeler on the ABC Family series Baby Daddy
 Emma Woodhouse, the title character of Jane Austen's Emma
 "Emma Zunz" in the eponymous short story by Jorge Luis Borges
 Emma, a character in the animated television series Grojband
 Emma, a character in the animated television series The Ridonculous Race
 Emma, a character in video game Sekiro: Shadows Die Twice

See also

References 

French feminine given names
German feminine given names
Czech feminine given names
English feminine given names
Slovak feminine given names
Slovene feminine given names
Italian feminine given names
Scandinavian feminine given names
Scottish feminine given names
Welsh feminine given names
Danish feminine given names
Norwegian feminine given names
Icelandic feminine given names
Swedish feminine given names
Finnish feminine given names
Dutch feminine given names
Lists of people by given name